Ave Caesar! is a 1919 Hungarian drama film directed by Alexander Korda and starring Oscar Beregi Sr., María Corda and Gábor Rajnay. A debauched Habsburg Prince sends out one of his aide-de-camps to bring him back a gypsy girl. The film was considered as an attack on the aristocracy. It was made by Korda for the state-owned film industry during the Hungarian Soviet Republic. Once the regime fell later that year Korda was arrested and eventually compelled to leave Hungary as part of the White Terror.

Cast
 Gábor Rajnay 
 María Corda   
 Oscar Beregi, Sr.

References

Bibliography
 Kulik, Karol. Alexander Korda: The Man Who Could Work Miracles. Virgin Books, 1990.

External links

1919 films
Hungarian silent films
Hungarian historical drama films
1910s Hungarian-language films
1910s historical drama films
Films directed by Alexander Korda
Hungarian black-and-white films
1919 drama films
Austro-Hungarian films
Silent drama films